Lindy Pearson was a player in the National Football League, with the Detroit Lions for two seasons before splitting the 1952 NFL season between the Lions and the Green Bay Packers.

References

1929 births
2011 deaths
Sportspeople from Oklahoma City
American football running backs
Detroit Lions players
Green Bay Packers players
Oklahoma Sooners football players
Players of American football from Oklahoma